Collins Avenue (CollinsAve) is an American television production company run by entertainment executive Jeff Collins. Working in a partnership arrangement with the London-based Content Media Corporation (formerly ContentFilm Group), CollinsAve produces reality programs in the U.S. with international distribution support from a partner company, Content Television (formerly Fireworks Entertainment).

CollinsAve will continue development and production in a five-year deal with Content Media Corporation as a lead investor in return for an equity stake.

Television Productions
CollinsAve primarily produces television content for networks in the US, including The CW Network, TLC, Lifetime, A&E, Country Music Television, Destination America, E!, Food Network, National Geographic Channel, Spike, WE tv, Vh1, and Animal Planet.

In January 2010, CollinsAve established an innovative partnership with Virgin America Airlines to create one of the first primetime network docuseries - Fly Girls. The series aired March 24, 2010 on the CW Television Network and follows five airline attendants throughout both their professional and personal lives working for the young, high-quality airline started in 2007 by Sir Richard Branson.

In February 2011, TLC aired Outrageous Kid Parties. Outrageous Kid Parties follows parents who spend incredible amounts of money to throw over-the-top birthday celebrations for their young children.

On July 13, 2011 Dance Moms premiered on Lifetime. Set in Pittsburgh's renowned Abby Lee Dance Company, owned and operated by notoriously demanding and passionate instructor Abby Lee Miller, Dance Moms follows eight children’s early steps on the road to stardom with their doting mothers who are there for every rehearsal, performance and bow, all under the discerning eye of Miller.

Other shows Collins Avenue has produced include American Stuffers for Animal Planet, The Drama Queen for E!, Ice Moms, Dance Moms: Miami, Dance Moms Chatter, and Abby's Ultimate Dance Competition for Lifetime, American Colony: Meet the Hutterites, Mennonite Made, and Anger Management for National Geographic Channel, and Dance Showdown, Season 3 by D-Trix, broadcast via YouTube.

On April 2, 2012, Collins Avenue was named one of Realscreen's Top 100, and is featured on the Realscreen website.

References

External links
Collins Avenue on IMDB via Internet Movie Database
Collins Avenue Website
Dance Moms Miami
American Colony: Meet the Hutterites
Mennonite Made
Dance Moms Miami Videos

Television production companies of the United States
Companies based in Los Angeles